Craig Rivera (born October 10, 1954) is an American television journalist, producer, and correspondent for Fox News Channel. He also appeared regularly on the Fox News Channel newsmagazine program Geraldo at Large.

Early life
Craig Rivera was born in Manhattan on October 10, 1954. He is the youngest child of Lillian (née Friedman), a waitress, and Cruz "Allen" Rivera (October 1, 1915 – November 1987), a restaurant worker and cab driver. Rivera's father was a Catholic Puerto Rican, and his mother was of Ashkenazi Russian Jewish descent. He grew up in Brooklyn and West Babylon, New York where he attended West Babylon High School. He has four siblings: Irene, Geraldo, Wilfredo, and Sharon.

Career
He attended Kutztown University and majored in Communications and Media studies. After graduating, he joined ABC's 20/20 in 1978 as a Producer. He transitioned to Inside Edition in 1986, working for the first time as an on-air talent.

He then left Inside Edition to, along with his brother, join Fox News Channel in light of the 9/11 attacks to cover American combat in the Afghanistan and Iraq Wars. Four years into his career at Fox, he became a Senior Field Producer for Geraldo at Large and appeared each week on the show to present an investigative reporting segment called “Craig Investigates”.

Recognitions
A year before he left Inside Edition, he worked on an investigative segment titled “Home Depot Dangers”, which won a Deadline Club Award for Best Series/Investigative Reporting.

References

External links
 "Craig Investigates" Segments on FoxNews.com
 

Living people
1954 births
American journalists of Puerto Rican descent
American people of Russian-Jewish descent
American television reporters and correspondents
Fox News people
Jewish American journalists
Kutztown University of Pennsylvania alumni
People from Brooklyn
People from West Babylon, New York
Journalists from New York City
21st-century American Jews